54 Marsh Wall is a residential/retail planned skyscraper in the Isle of Dogs, London. The building was approved by Tower Hamlets on 19 January 2017. At 140 meters high and containing 216 residential units, the tower will be among a number of similar residential skyscrapers under construction in the Isle of Dogs, including South Quay Plaza and the Landmark Pinnacle. An earlier proposal, submitted in 2014, envisioned 240 residential units involving two twin towers at 39 and 29 stories.

See also 
List of tallest buildings and structures in London
List of tallest buildings in the United Kingdom

References

External links 
 54 Marsh Wall 54marshwall.com

Skyscrapers in the London Borough of Tower Hamlets
Proposed skyscrapers in London
Millwall